Uvedale is a given name and a surname. Notable people with the name include:

Forename
Uvedale Price (1747–1829), Herefordshire landowner who was at the heart of the 'Picturesque debate' of the 1790s
Uvedale Shobdon Corbett DSO (1909–2005), British soldier, politician and businessman
Uvedale Tomkins Price (1685–1764), British Member of Parliament
Uvedale Corbett Junior Poor Law Inspector
Sir Uvedale Corbet, 3rd Baronet (1668–1701)

Surname
Edmund Uvedale (disambiguation), more than one person
Robert Uvedale (1642–1722), English teacher and horticulturist
William Uvedale (c. 1581 – 1652), English politician